Cnemaspis pachaimalaiensis, the Pachaimalai dwarf gecko, is a species of diurnal, rock-dwelling, insectivorous gecko endemic to  India.

The species name refers to its type locality, the Pachaimalai Hills.

References

 Cnemaspis pachaimalaiensis

pachaimalaiensis
Reptiles of India
Reptiles described in 2022
Taxa named by Ishan Agarwal
Taxa named by Akshay Khandekar